Elizabeth Krueger (born November 20, 1957) is a member of the New York State Senate, representing District 28 on the East Side of Manhattan. First elected in a special election in 2002, Krueger is a Democrat.

Background
Krueger was born in New York City to Harvey M. Krueger and Constance Krueger. She has two sisters, Abigail and Cathleen. A brother, Peter, died of AIDS in 1988.  Her father was the CEO of the investment bank Kuhn, Loeb & Co., and served as vice chairman of Lehman Brothers following the merger with Kuhn, Loeb & Co. in 1977.

She earned a B.A. from Northwestern University in Social Policy and Human Development, and a master's degree from the University of Chicago's Harris School of Public Policy.

Prior to elected office, Krueger served for 15 years as associate director of the Community Food Resource Center (CFRC), and she is the founding director of the New York City Food Bank.

She is married to John E. Seley, a professor of urban planning and geography at The City University of New York Graduate Center and Princeton's Woodrow Wilson School of Public Affairs.

New York Senate
Krueger initially ran for the state Senate in 2000, narrowly losing to Republican Senator Roy M. Goodman by less than a percentage point. Less than two years later, Goodman resigned and Krueger won the special election to replace him. Since then, she has never faced a challenging re-election. Many years later, The New York Times reported that months after the 2000 election that Krueger lost, hundreds of ballots from a pro-Krueger area were found in a Board of Elections air duct, although Krueger did not learn of this until just before the 2002 election that she won.

After the Democratic party took the majority in the 2018 elections, Krueger was elected the Chair of the Senate Finance Committee, one of the most powerful committees in the Senate.

In 2021, Krueger was one of two members of the senate to vote against a bill designating baseball as the official state sport of New York.

References

Further reading
Paterson, David "Black, Blind, & In Charge: A Story of Visionary Leadership and Overcoming Adversity." New York, New York, 2020

External links
 
 New York State Senate: Liz Krueger
 Food Bank For New York City

Living people
Jewish American state legislators in New York (state)
Jewish women politicians
University of Chicago alumni
Politicians from New York City
Democratic Party New York (state) state senators
Northwestern University alumni
Women state legislators in New York (state)
21st-century American politicians
21st-century American women politicians
1957 births
21st-century American Jews